Lori Ann Henry (born March 20, 1966) is an American retired soccer defender and former member and captain of the United States women's national soccer team. She was the only player from the first match ever played by the national team who made it to the 1991 Women's World Cup Championship in China and one of two players to hit double-figures in caps.

Early life
Henry grew up in the Seattle, Washington area and attended Shorewood High School in Shoreline, Washington where she was a star soccer player for the T-Birds.

University of North Carolina
Henry attended the University of North Carolina from 1986 to 1989 and helped the Tar Heels to three national women's soccer championships. Henry was twice selected first team All-America. She was also selected to Soccer America's All-Decade Team in 1990.

Playing career

International
In 1985, Henry was a member of the first women's national soccer team the U.S. fielded.  She played for the United States women's national soccer team from 1985 to 1991, including three years as captain. In 1991, she was part of the team that won the first Women's World Cup in China.

Coaching career
Henry began her coaching career as an assistant at UNC-Greensboro and later served as the head women's soccer coach at Ohio State University for four years.

See also
 1985 United States women's national soccer team

References

Further reading 
 Crothers, Tim (2012), The Man Watching: Anson Dorrance and the University of North Carolina Women's Soccer Dynasty, Macmillan, 
 Grainey, Timothy (2012), Beyond Bend It Like Beckham: The Global Phenomenon of Women's Soccer, University of Nebraska Press, 
 Lisi, Clemente A. (2010), The U.S. Women's Soccer Team: An American Success Story, Scarecrow Press, 
 Nash, Tim (2016), ''It's Not the Glory: The Remarkable First Thirty Years of US Women's Soccer', Lulu Press,

External links
 
 US Soccer profile

Living people
1966 births
United States women's international soccer players
Women's association football central defenders
North Carolina Tar Heels women's soccer players
1991 FIFA Women's World Cup players
People from Shoreline, Washington
American women's soccer players
Soccer players from Washington (state)
FIFA Women's World Cup-winning players